Eutrochium maculatum,  the spotted joe-pyeweed, is a North American species of flowering plant in the family Asteraceae. It is widespread through much of the United States and Canada. It is the only species of the genus Eutrochium  found west of the Great Plains.

Stems are sometimes completely purple, sometimes green with purple spots. One plant can produce numerous rose-purple flower heads in late summer, each head with  8-22 disc flowers but no ray flowers. The specific name maculatum, meaning spotted, refers to the purple spots on the stem.

Spotted joe-pyeweed thrives in marshes, rich fens and swamps. It also does well in man-made moist expanses such as ditches, seepage areas and wet fields. Above all else the plant flourishes in the non-shaded environments that are also abundant in wetlands.

It is a larval host to the Clymene moth, the eupatorium borer moth, the ruby tiger moth, and the three-lined flower moth. The plant also attracts butterflies and honeybees.

Varieties
The following varieties are known:
Eutrochium maculatum var. bruneri (A. Gray) E. E. Lamont - western Canada (British Columbia to Saskatchewan), western USA (Minnesota west to Idaho, south to Arizona + New Mexico)
Eutrochium maculatum var. foliosum (Fernald) E. E. Lamont - eastern Canada (Newfoundland to Ontario), northern USA (Maine to Minnesota)
Eutrochium maculatum var. maculatum - eastern Canada (Newfoundland to Ontario), eastern USA (Maine to Minnesota, south to northern Georgia)

Cultivars
The following cultivars are recipients of the Royal Horticultural Society's Award of Garden Merit (listed under the synonym Eupatorium maculatum):-
(Atropurpureum Group) 'Orchard Dene'  
(Atropurpureum Group) 'Purple Bush'  
(Atropurpureum Group) 'Riesenschirm'

References

maculatum
Flora of Canada
Flora of the United States
Flora of Ontario
Butterfly food plants
Flora without expected TNC conservation status